Dysselsdorp is a village in Garden Route District Municipality in the Western Cape province of South Africa.

The village is located approximately 30 kilometers east of Oudtshoorn. It is the site of a London Mission Station established in 1838. The station has been managed by the Oudtshoorn Divisional Council since 1926.

References

Populated places in the Oudtshoorn Local Municipality
Populated places established in 1838
1838 establishments in the Cape Colony